Kallumthazham or Kallumthaazham is a neighbourhood of Kollam city in Kerala, India. It is the 19th ward of Kollam Municipal Corporation.

Importance
Kallumthazham comes under Kilikollur zone of Kollam Municipal Corporation where the most cashew processing factories are located in India. It is the meeting point of two major national highways, with NH-66 Bypass, Kollam and NH-744, passing through the city. It is considered one of the major transport hubs in Kollam city. The Valiya Koonambaikulam temple is very close to Kallumthazham.

See also
 Kollam
 Kollam Bypass
 National Highway 66 (India)
 National Highway 744 (India)
 Kilikollur

References

Neighbourhoods in Kollam
Cashew processing hubs in Kollam